Masuada Karokhi is an Afghan peace activist, women's rights advocate, and recipient of the N-Peace Award in 2013. Karokhi ran for the office of member of parliament (a member of the Lower House) for Herat twice, in 2005 and 2010. She won in 2010.

References

External links
 A staunch women's rights campaigner: Masuada Karokhi wins the N-Peace Award 2013 YouTube video

Living people
1962 births
21st-century Afghan politicians
20th-century Afghan women
21st-century Afghan women politicians
20th-century Afghan educators
21st-century Afghan educators
Afghan women activists